Se language may refer to:

Fanafo language of Espiritu Santo, Vanuatu
Erromanga language of southern Vanuatu
Saxwe language of Benin, West Africa